Attila Laták (9 September 1945 – 8 December 1991) was a Hungarian wrestler who competed in the 1972 Summer Olympics.

References

External links 
 
 

1945 births
1991 deaths
Olympic wrestlers of Hungary
Wrestlers at the 1972 Summer Olympics
Hungarian male sport wrestlers